The Voice of Freedom Party is a Sufi Islamist political party in Egypt The party is backed by the Rifa'i Sufi order, which is the largest Sufi order in Egypt.

References

Islamic political parties in Egypt
Political parties with year of establishment missing
Political parties in Egypt
Sufism